The Cologne Open is a defunct men's tennis tournament that was part of the ATP World Series of the ATP Tour for one year in 1992. The event was held in Cologne, Germany from 14 September until 20 September 1992 and was played on outdoor clay courts. The prize money for the tournament was $300,000. Bernd Karbacher won the singles event while Horacio de la Peña and Gustavo Luza teamed-up to win the doubles event.

Finals

Men's singles

Men's doubles

See also
 Cologne Grand Prix
 2020 Bett1Hulks Indoors
 2020 Bett1Hulks Championship

References

External links
ITF Results
Official website

Tennis tournaments in Germany
1992 in tennis
Sport in Cologne
Clay court tennis tournaments
1992 in German tennis
Recurring sporting events established in 1992
Recurring sporting events disestablished in 1992
ATP Tour
1992 in German women's sport